Fellows of the Royal Society elected in 1792.

Fellows

 Archibald Alison (1757–1839), author
 William Bosville (1745–1813)
 Leonard Chappelow (c.1744–1820), clergyman
 James Stanier Clarke (1766–1834), librarian
 James Currie (1756–1805), physician
 Samuel Davis (1760–1819), East India Company surveyor
 Richard Colt Hoare (1758–1838), antiquarian
 Thomas Hussey (1741–1803), Irish bishop
 John Komarzewski (c.1744–1810)
 Charles Long, 1st Baron Farnborough (1761–1838), MP
 George Macartney, 1st Earl Macartney (1737–1806), diplomat
 Frederick Montagu (1733–1800), MP
 David Pennant (d. 1841)
 Richard Dickson Shackleford (1743–1829)
 James Six (1731–1893), scientist
 Samuel Solly (1724–1807)
 Stephen Weston (1747–1830), clergyman

References

1792 in science
1792
1792 in Great Britain